The 2013–14 Deportivo de La Coruña season was the 83rd season in club history and the first season back in the Segunda División following relegation from La Liga.

Players

Senior squad 
Updated 14 March 2014

From youth team

Out on loan

Competitions

Segunda División

League table

Copa del Rey

References

Deportivo de La Coruña seasons
Deportivo de La Coruna